Ekren may refer to:

Nazım Ekren (born 1956), Deputy Prime Minister of Turkey responsible for economic affairs
Ekren convention, bridge term

Turkish-language surnames